is a Japanese football player.

Club statistics
Updated to 23 February 2018.

1Includes Promotion Playoffs to J1.

References

External links

Profile at Avispa Fukuoka

1984 births
Living people
Association football people from Osaka Prefecture
People from Sakai, Osaka
Japanese footballers
J1 League players
J2 League players
Japan Football League players
Avispa Fukuoka players
ReinMeer Aomori players
Association football goalkeepers